Margaret Inequane also called Margaret Ine Quane and Margaret Quaine (died 1617) was an English woman who was executed for witchcraft. 

She was accused of witchcraft with her ten-year-old son John Cubon. She was accused of using a fertility spell to secure a good crop. Her son was convicted of having 'witches blood' by virtue of being her son. She was judged guilty of witchcraft. Her conviction also meant a conviction of her son. 

She and her son was executed for witchcraft in Castletown at Isle of Man in 1617. They are stated to have been executed by burning, which was not otherwise a common method of execution for witchcraft in England. 

She is known as the only woman confirmed to have been executed for witchcraft on the Isle of Man,  and together with her son, one of only two people confirmed to have been executed for witchcraft on the island.

Legacy
Her case was portrayed in the 2013 film Solace in Wicca.

References

  Gregory J Durston, Crimen Exceptum: The English Witch Prosecution in Context
 http://www.isle-of-man.com/manxnotebook/towns/castltwn/witch.htm

17th-century English people
Witch trials in England
People executed for witchcraft
1617 deaths
17th-century executions by England

17th-century Manx people